Just Me is the tenth studio album by American singer Keith Sweat. It was released by Atco Records on May 13, 2008 in the United States. The album marked Sweat's debut with the label following his departure from Elektra Records. Just Me became his first regular album to top the US Top R&B/Hip-Hop Albums in a decade.

Background
Along with a duet with Keyshia Cole, the album reunites with producer Teddy Riley, as well as former Kut Klose member Athena Cage, with whom he previously work with on "Nobody." The album also feature Chris Conner and Paisley Bettis. This is also the first album with Riley since Sweat's studio album Keep It Comin' (1991). Sweat, who executive produced the project, said he named the project Just Me "because I'm giving the people what they expect from me. You hear other artists out here who make the mistake of trying to be trendy. They really try to keep up. I know people want to hear Keith Sweat. I'm conscious of the people who have followed me the whole time, since day one. I remember that I have a fan base and I'm very careful to give the people what they expect from me."

Critical reception

Allmusic editor Anthony Tognazzini found that "longtime fans needn’t fear that Sweat has undergone any major changes [...] Just Me is classic Sweat. Uptempo dance tracks would be a distraction, so Sweat sticks to what he does best: contemporary quiet storm that acts as the perfect soundtrack to candlelight and silk sheets. Guest appearances by Keyshia Cole and Athena Cage sweeten the pot, but it’s Sweat’s passionate vocals (not to mention the disc’s slick production) that steal the show."

Track listing
Credits adapted from the album's liner notes.

Notes
 signifies a co-producer
 signifies an additional producer
Sample credits
"Somebody" samples "What's Come Over Me", performed by Blue Magic.

Charts

Weekly charts

Year-end charts

References

Keith Sweat albums
2008 albums
Albums produced by Teddy Riley